Steele House may refer to:

Steele-Fowler House, Huntsville, Alabama, listed on the National Register of Historic Places (NRHP)
Steele House (Denver, Colorado), 555 S. Downing, Denver, Colorado, designed by architects Marean & Norton
Allyn Steele House, West Hartford, Connecticut, NRHP-listed
House at 7246 San Carlos, Jacksonville, Florida, also known as the Steele House, NRHP-listed
Steele-Cobb House, Decatur, Georgia, listed on the NRHP in DeKalb County, Georgia
T.C. Steele Boyhood Home, Waveland, Indiana, listed on the NRHP in Montgomery County, Indiana
Theodore Clement Steele House and Studio, Nashville, Indiana, listed on the NRHP in Brown County, Indiana
Robert Steele House, Keene, Kentucky, listed on the NRHP in Jessamine County, Kentucky
Drewsilla Steele House, Lexington, Kentucky, listed on the NRHP in Fayette County, Kentucky
Stone House on Steele's Grant, Tyrone, Kentucky, listed on the NRHP in Woodford County, Kentucky
John Steele House (Stoneham, Massachusetts), NRHP-listed, in Middlesex County
L.C. Steele House, Corinth, Mississippi, listed on the NRHP in Alcorn County, Mississippi
Steele House (Brooklyn, New York), listed as a New York City Designated Landmark
Steele Hall (Syracuse University), Syracuse, New York
John Steele House (Salisbury, North Carolina), listed on the National Register of Historic Places in Rowan County, North Carolina 
William Steele House, Bethesda, Tennessee, a historic, house in the Williamson County unincorporated community of Bethesda
William Steele House, Franklin, Tennessee, listed on the NRHP in Williamson County
Steele Hall (Memphis, Tennessee)
Wardlaw-Steele House, Ripley, Tennessee, listed on the NRHP in Lauderdale County, Tennessee
Steele House (Navasota, Texas), listed on the NRHP in Grimes County, Texas
John Steele House (Toquerville, Utah), listed on the National Register of Historic Places in Washington County, Utah
Fowler-Steele House, Windsor, Vermont, listed on the National Register of Historic Places in Windsor County, Vermont
Alden Hatch Steele House, Olympia, Washington, listed on the NRHP in Thurston County, Washington
Steele Homestead, Boulder, Wyoming, list on the NRHP in Sublette County, Wyoming

See also
John Steele House (disambiguation)
Steele's Iron Works (40LS15), Napier, Tennessee, listed on the NRHP in Tennessee